Wiktoria Pikulik (born 15 June 1998) is a Polish professional racing cyclist. In 2019, she became a three-time national track cycling champion, winning the under-23 omnium, team pursuit and Madison events. She also rode in the women's madison event at the 2019 UEC European Track Championships, with her sister Daria, securing qualification points for the 2020 Summer Olympics in Tokyo.

References

1998 births
Living people
Polish female cyclists
People from Darłowo
Cyclists at the 2020 Summer Olympics
Olympic cyclists of Poland
20th-century Polish women
21st-century Polish women